A butcher knife or butcher's knife is a knife designed and used primarily for the butchering or dressing of animal carcasses.

Use

Today, the butcher knife is used throughout the world in the meat processing trade. The heftier blade works well for splitting, stripping and cutting meat. Other similar meat-cutting knives include the carving knife and the cleaver. The carving knife is usually designed for slicing thin cuts of meat and often has a blunt or rounded point, with a scalloped or Granton blade to improve separation of sliced cuts of meat. The cleaver is similar to the butcher's knife, but has a lighter and thinner blade for precision cutting.

History

From the late 18th century to the mid-1840s, the butcher knife was a key tool for mountain men. Simple, useful and cheap to produce, they were used for everything from skinning beaver, cutting food, self-defense, and scalping. During this time, John Wilson, of Sheffield, England, was a major exporter of this type of knife to the Americans. These knives can be identified by brand markings and the stamp I. Wilson. Heavy cleavers were traditionally hung up on a hook for ease of access.

References

Kitchen knives